"Rain on the Roof" (sometimes titled "You and Me and Rain on the Roof") is song by American pop band the Lovin' Spoonful, written by John Sebastian. It was released as a single in October1966 and was included on the album Hums of the Lovin' Spoonful the following month. The song reached number ten on the Billboard Hot 100 chart, making it the Lovin' Spoonful's sixth consecutive single to reach the top ten in the United States.

"Rain on the Roof" features an interplay between several guitars played by Sebastian and Zal Yanovsky, as well as an Irish harp. Yanovsky manipulated the settings on his electric guitar and amplifier to generate a French horn-like sound. Released three months after the harder-rock styled single "Summer in the City", "Rain on the Roof" represented a return to the softer sound for which the Lovin' Spoonful had become known. Sebastian's push to release the song as the follow-up single led to consternation among his bandmates, who felt that their next single ought to have furthered a harder sound. Contemporary reviewers noted the difference between the singles, while still positively reviewing "Rain on the Roof".

Composition and recording 
John Sebastian composed "Rain on the Roof" after a night spent listening to the rain with his wife Loretta "Lorey" Kaye in their Greenwich Village apartment. The song similarly describes two lovers listening to the rain. The composition ends on a major seventh chord, which musicologist Walter Everett writes means the song "never [achieves a] full-cadence closure", leaving it feeling unresolved.

"Rain on the Roof" was produced and arranged by the Lovin' Spoonful's regular producer Erik Jacobsen. The recording features an interplay of guitars between Zal Yanovsky and Sebastian. In addition to both a pedal steel guitar and a Ditson acoustic twelve-string guitar, Sebastian played an Irish harp, a stringed instrument he acquired while in Dublin. Yanovsky played his hollow Guild Thunderbird electric guitar. To generate a French horn-like sound, Yanovksy turned the treble off on his guitar but turned up the amplifier's treble and gain, resulting in distortion and the beginning of feedback. Bassist Steve Boone later reflected being "mesmerized" by each of his bandmates' guitar work, characterizing it as "like music from heaven". Author Maury Dean considers the song soft rock due to its twelve-string guitar melody, while author Bernard Gendron considers the guitars reminiscent of harpsichords, leading him to place the song in the contemporary baroque rock trend.

After recording the backing track, the band's earliest attempts at recording vocals featured a round sung by Sebastian, Yanovsky and drummer Joe Butler, similar in style to their 1965 song "Didn't Want to Have to Do It". They abandoned this format for the final recording, instead opting for a solo vocal from Sebastian.

Release and reception 
The possibility of releasing "Rain on the Roof" as a single generated disagreement among the members of the Lovin' Spoonful. The band's previous single "Summer in the City" featured a harder sound than their previous output, and it had attracted new fans to the group after it reached number one on the Billboard Hot 100 chart in August1966. Both Boone and Butler worried that returning to a softer sound with "Rain on the Roof" would potentially alienate the band's new fans. Sebastian countered that the band ought to avoid releasing consecutive singles which sounded too similar, further contending that "Rain on the Roof" would add another dimension to their sound.

Kama Sutra Records issued "Rain on the Roof" as a single in October1966. In the October8 issue of Billboard, the magazine's review panel highlighted the song as likely to reach the top 20 of the Hot 100, and the single debuted on the chart the following week at number 76. It remained on the chart for ten weeks and peaked at number ten, making it the Lovin' Spoonful's sixth consecutive single to reach the top ten. The song was later included on the band's November1966 album Hums of the Lovin' Spoonful, where it appeared as the opening track of side two. Because the song shared its name with a 1931 composition by songwriter Ann Ronell, Kama Sutra altered its title on Hums of the Lovin' Spoonful to "You and Me and Rain on the Roof".

Among contemporary critics, Billboard reviewer counted "Rain on the Roof" as a continuation of the band's "unpredictable, fresh, original material", writing that the "clever rhythm ballad with [a] baroque feel" was a likely blockbuster. Reviewers in both Cash Box and Record World magazines highlighted the song's difference from "Summer in the City", Cash Box reviewer calling it a return to the band's "soft-rock stylings". In an interview with Melody Maker magazine in December1966, Bruce Woodley of the Australian pop group the Seekers praised the song's guitar work as beautiful while questioning why the song was not a hit in the United Kingdom. Writing about the song decades later, author Charles Winick considers "Rain on the Roof" melody and lyrics as having more in common with the music of decades earlier than contemporary rock music.

Charts

Notes

References

Citations

Sources 

 
 
 
 
 
 
 
 
 
 
 
 
 
 
 
 

1966 singles
1966 songs
The Lovin' Spoonful songs
The Flying Pickets songs
Songs written by John Sebastian
Song recordings produced by Erik Jacobsen
Kama Sutra Records singles
Songs about weather